Vinaya Prakash ( Bhat), also credited as Vinaya Prasad, is an Indian actress who has primarily featured in Kannada, and Malayalam films and TV series besides acting in Telugu language films.

Career
Vinaya Prasad hails from Udupi district of Karnataka state. Prasad made her film debut with a small role in G. V. Iyer's Madhwacharya in 1988. She worked in smaller character roles before playing the leading lady in Ganeshana Maduve opposite Anant Nag. The film was a huge success and she went on to act in many more films in not only Kannada but also Malayalam, Tamil and Telugu. Some of her notable Kannada films include Ganeshana Maduve, Neenu Nakkare Haalu Sakkare, Gauri Ganesha, Mysore Jaana and Suryodaya. She starred in a supporting role in the all-time blockbuster Manichitrathazhu, opposite Mohanlal. In Tamil, Prasad has acted as the heroine in the hit movie Thaikulame Thaikulame with Pandiarajan and Urvashi starring. In Telugu, her movies include Indra, Donga Dongadi and Andhrudu, for which her performance won a lot of praise.

After a successful career as a lead actress, Prasad switched over to character roles in South Indian films and remains a sought-after actress in Kannada, Malayalam, Tamil and Telugu movies. Prasad is also an effective compere and singer. Prasad has compered several important events like Vasantha Habba in Nrityagram and the annual Dasara procession in Mysore. She has starred in the longest-running and most popular daily soap opera on Malayalam TV, Sthree, which aired from late 1998 to mid 2000 on Asianet television channel. The popularity of this soap made her a household name among Malayalis. In 2006, she returned to the Malayalam small screen to reprise her role as Indu in the sequel to the original Sthree, also named, Sthree.

Personal life

Vinaya is from the Udupi district in Karnataka and was raised in Udupi. In 1988 she married V. R. K Prasad, a director and editor of Kannada films, who expired at a young age. In 2002 Vinaya married Jyotiprakash and currently resides in Bangalore with her husband and daughter, Prathama Prasad. Jyotiprakash has a son named Jai Atre from his previous marriage who is into film direction and screenwriting in Mumbai.

Filmography

Television
Serials
 

Shows

References

External links

Indian film actresses
Actresses from Karnataka
Actresses in Kannada cinema
People from Udupi
Living people
Actresses in Malayalam cinema
Actresses in Tamil cinema
Actresses in Tulu cinema
Actresses in Telugu cinema
Indian television actresses
Actresses in Kannada television
Actresses in Malayalam television
20th-century Indian actresses
21st-century Indian actresses
People from Udupi district
Actresses in Tamil television
Year of birth missing (living people)